Juan Manuel González Iglesias (born April 21, 1999) is a Mexican professional stock car racing driver. He last competed part-time in the NASCAR Camping World Truck Series, driving the No. 60 Ford F-150 for Lira Motorsports. He is the 2019 NASCAR FedEx Challenge Series champion.

Motorsports career results

NASCAR
(key) (Bold – Pole position awarded by qualifying time. Italics – Pole position earned by points standings or practice time. * – Most laps led.)

Gander Outdoors Truck Series

K&N Pro Series East

 Season still in progress
 Ineligible for series points

References

External links
 
 Profile at Escudería Telmex

1999 births
Living people
Mexican racing drivers
NASCAR drivers
Racing drivers from Mexico City